Killamarsh Central is a former railway station in Killamarsh, Derbyshire, England.

Ambiguity
Three stations served the village, all of which started as plain "Killamarsh":
  on the former LD&ECR's Beighton Branch, and
 Killamarsh Central which is the subject of this article.

History
The station was opened in 1892 by the Manchester, Sheffield and Lincolnshire Railway when it began to build south into Derbyshire.

Despite its name Killamarsh Central Station was on the western edge of Killamarsh as were all of the three stations in the village. It was renamed 'Central' because it was the centre of the three stations which served the village and also because it was on the old Great Central Main Line which ran between London Marylebone and Manchester via .

The station opened on 1 June 1892 as Killamarsh. It was renamed Killamarsh Central by British Railways on 25 September 1950 and closed on 4 March 1963. Removal of the tracks through the station was completed on 17 February 1983. The station had two platforms with a building on each, a footbridge joined the two.

The buildings were used as a Film and TV prop emporium until the owner died in 2007. The buildings were still extant in 2009,October 2009 but were a burnt out shell by June 2010.

Modern times
The trackbed now forms part of the Trans Pennine Trail.

The station footbridge remains open as a public right of way between Station Road and Forge Lane, with the stairway to the northbound platform providing access to the Trans Pennine Trail. The northbound platform itself can be walked as part of the trail, though all its features have been removed. Access to the southbound platform and its stairway has been blocked off.

References

Notes

Sources

External links
Killamarsh Central (in red) on 1955 OS Map
Killamarsh Central on Disused Stations website
Killamarsh Central Station and other Killamarsh photos on local history site

Disused railway stations in Derbyshire
Former Great Central Railway stations
Railway stations in Great Britain opened in 1892
Railway stations in Great Britain closed in 1963